Seal Rock (or Seal Rocks) is a group of small rock formation islands in the Lands End area of the Outer Richmond District in western San Francisco, California. They are located just offshore in the Pacific Ocean, at the north end of the Ocean Beach, near the Cliff House and Sutro Baths ruins.

The name is derived from the population of Steller's sea lions (Eumetopias jubatus) and California sea lions (Zalophus californianus), who haul out on the rock. Both species are often colloquially called "seals".  The formations and wildlife are protected within the Golden Gate National Recreation Area.

Geology
Near the end of the last ice age, this part of the coastline was thought to be between eight and twenty five miles westward of its current position - around five thousand years ago, with the melting of the ice, the sea level rose to its current level.

The coastal features found here today were formed by the actions of waves, wind, and the movement of sand. The geology of this part of the coastline of San Francisco consists of steep rocky cliffs which are punctuated by narrow sandy pocket beaches found at the north end of the city and long sandy stretches at Ocean Beach and Fort Funston to the south. 
The local features, and indeed the entire San Francisco Peninsula, come from the northern aspect of the Santa Cruz Mountains. Before the urban development seen today, the area landward of Ocean Beach consisted of barren sand fields inland to Twin Peaks. The first known map of the area, dating from 1852, was made by the U.S. Coast and Geodetic Survey and describes the coastline here as being entirely unaltered by humans.

The geologic layers beneath Ocean Beach, starting from the top (i.e. the youngest), are:
Placed fill, from various construction activities over the last 100 years or so.
Colma Formation
Merced Formation
Bedrock.

The Colma and Merced Formations consist generally of poorly-sorted sandy deposits, probably deposited during some earlier period of greater sea levels. The Colma Formation is found under the dune sands and also extends inland.

See also

49-Mile Scenic Drive
Cliff House, San Francisco
Lands End, San Francisco
List of islands of California
Sutro Heights Park
Sutro Historic District

References

External links

 NPS−Golden Gate National Recreation Area: Seal Rocks, vestiges of Lands End
 Cliffhouseproject.com:  Seal Rocks images
  NPS-GGNRA: Visiting Lands End
 NPS-GGNRA: Lands End History and Culture
 Vestiges of Lands End — digital guidebook.

Islands of San Francisco
Islands of the San Francisco Bay Area
Islands of Northern California
Geology of San Francisco
Golden Gate National Recreation Area
Landforms of San Francisco
Landmarks in San Francisco
Richmond District, San Francisco
Rock formations of California
Uninhabited islands of California
Pacific islands of California